Clarence Herbert Vontom (10 June 1914 – 14 October 2000) was an Australian rules footballer who played with St Kilda in the Victorian Football League (VFL).

Vontom was educated at Wesley College and captained Collegians in the Victorian Amateur Football Association. A rover, he was already 24 when he began his VFL career. In 1939, his first season at St Kilda, Vontom spent much of his time in the forward pocket and was his club's third leading goal-kicker with 28 goals. When Frank Kelly was called away on war service, early in the 1944 season, Vontom took over as captain and remained in charge the following year. He didn't play senior football in 1946, then made his way to Brighton.

References

External links
 
 

1914 births
2000 deaths
People educated at Wesley College (Victoria)
Australian rules footballers from Victoria (Australia)
St Kilda Football Club players
Brighton Football Club players
Collegians Football Club players